Brian Alexander may refer to:

 Brian Alexander (broadcaster) (born 1957), British broadcaster
 Bryan Alexander (futurist), American researcher and writer
 Brian Alexander (water polo) (born 1983), American water polo player
 The Hon. Brian Alexander, heir presumptive to the Earl Alexander of Tunis

See also